Clay County Progress is a weekly newspaper based in Clay County, North Carolina, covering Clay and Cherokee counties in North Carolina and Towns County, Georgia.

See also
 List of newspapers published in North Carolina

References

Weekly newspapers published in North Carolina
Clay County, North Carolina